The Virginia House of Delegates election of 1997 was held on Tuesday, November 4.

Results

Overview 

Source

See also 
 1997 United States elections
 1997 Virginia elections
 1997 Virginia gubernatorial election
 1997 Virginia lieutenant gubernatorial election
 1997 Virginia Attorney General election

References 

House of Delegates
Virginia
Virginia House of Delegates elections